Alfredo Rodríguez (born June 17, 1994) is a Cuban professional baseball shortstop who is currently a free agent. He signed with the Cincinnati Reds organization as an international free agent in 2016.

Career
Rodríguez began his professional career in the Cuban National Series for Isla de la Juventud. He was the 2014-15 Rookie of the Year, and won the National Series gold glove award equivalent.

Cincinnati Reds
Rodríguez defected from Cuba, and signed with the Cincinnati Reds as an international free agent on July 4, 2016. He received a $7 million signing bonus.

Rodríguez played for the DSL Reds in 2016, hitting .234/.314/.299/.613 with 0 home runs, 8 RBI, and 9 stolen bases. He spent the 2017 season with the Daytona Tortugas, hitting .253/.294/.294/.588 with 2 home runs and 36 RBI. He split the 2018 season between the Arizona League Reds, Daytona, and the Pensacola Blue Wahoos, hitting a combined .210/.273/.312/.585 with 2 home runs and 15 RBI. He played for the Scottsdale Scorpions of the Arizona Fall League following the 2018 season. Rodríguez split the 2019 season between the Chattanooga Lookouts and Louisville Bats, hitting a combined .267/.314/.327/.641 with 1 home run and 34 RBI. He did not play a minor league game in 2020 due to the cancellation of the minor league season caused by the COVID-19 pandemic. In 2021, Rodríguez returned to Triple-A Louisville and hit .283/.333/.354 with 3 home runs and 48 RBI in 117 games. On March 12, 2022, Rodríguez was released by the Reds organization.

Washington Nationals
On April 25, 2022, Rodríguez signed a minor league contract with the Washington Nationals organization and was assigned to the Triple-A Rochester Red Wings. He was released on July 21, 2022.

References

External links

1994 births
Living people
Arizona League Reds players
Baseball shortstops
Chattanooga Lookouts players
Daytona Tortugas players
Defecting Cuban baseball players
Dominican Summer League Reds players
Estrellas Orientales players
Cuban expatriate baseball players in the Dominican Republic
Isla de la Juventud players
Louisville Bats players
Pensacola Blue Wahoos players
Scottsdale Scorpions players
Baseball players from Havana